Clarence Ellis Harbison (March 3, 1885 - October 1, 1960) was an animal psychologist.

Biography
C. Ellis Harbison was born in 1885 in Schenectady, New York. Previously divorced and widowed, he married Mary Louise Jorjorian in 1951 and had a son, Michael Harbison, in 1953. He resided in Darien, Connecticut. Stumping the panel, Harbison made an appearance on the popular [career/identity] guessing game television show, What's My Line?, in 1954. He died at age 75 on October 1, 1960 in Preston, Connecticut.

References

1885 births
1960 deaths
Dog trainers